Guy of Ibelin (French: Guy d'Ibelin) (1215/1218 – after May 1255) was marshal and constable of the kingdom of Cyprus.  He was the fifth son of  John of Ibelin, the Old Lord of Beirut, and of Melisende of Arsuf. He had close relations with the king of Cyprus, Henry I, acting as witness for two royal decrees; he was probably one of the king's executors named in a papal bull of Pope Alexander IV.  With his brother Baldwin of Ibelin, he led the Cypriot crusaders in the siege of Damietta in 1248. According to the medieval chronicler Jean de Joinville, he was one of the most accomplished knights of his generation and a benevolent ruler on Cyprus.  Joinville recounts an episode when he, Guy and Baldwin had been taken prisoner by Saracen rebels:

Guy married Phillipa Berlais, daughter of Aimery Berlais. Their children were:

 Baudouin d'Ibelin, bailli of the kingdom of Jerusalem, then constable of the kingdom of Cyprus
 Jean d'Ibelin, assassinated in 1277
 Aimery d'Ibelin
Balian d'Ibelin (1240–1302), seneschal of Cyprus 1286-1302
Philippe d'Ibelin (1253 † 1318), seneschal of Cyprus 1302-1318
 Isabelle d'Ibelin (1241 † 1324), wife of king Hugh III of Cyprus
 Alice d'Ibelin, married Eudes de Dampierre sur Salon
 Eschive d'Ibelin, a nun
 Mélisende d'Ibelin
 Marie d'Ibelin

See also
 Officers of the Kingdom of Cyprus

References

House of Ibelin
1210s births
13th-century deaths
Christians of the Sixth Crusade